The High Commission of the United Republic of Tanzania in London is the diplomatic mission of Tanzania in the United Kingdom. It is located in Stratford Place, a small cul-de-sac just off Oxford Street which it shares with the High Commission of Botswana. It was the former residence of Alice Liddell, the heroine of the children's book Alice's Adventures in Wonderland.

Gallery

See also
 List of diplomatic missions of Tanzania

References

External links
 Official site

Tanzania
London
Buildings and structures in the City of Westminster
Tanzania–United Kingdom relations
Marylebone